Sevsk is the name of several inhabited localities in Russia.

Urban localities
Sevsk, Bryansk Oblast, a town in Sevsky District of Bryansk Oblast; 

Rural localities
Sevsk, Kemerovo Oblast, a settlement in Burlakovskaya Rural Territory of Prokopyevsky District in Kemerovo Oblast